Manels is a marketer and manufacturer of footwear and other leather goods in the Philippines.

The company was first established as a grocery/pharmacy in 1964, to which its name derives from co-founders Manuel Siggaoat and Nelia Villarama Siggaoat.

Retail companies of the Philippines
Companies based in Pasig
Shoe companies of the Philippines
Sportswear brands